Goleti is a census town near to Rebbana mandal in Adilabad District of the Indian state of Telangana.

References 

 
 

Census towns in Adilabad district
Cities and towns in Adilabad district